Expedition with Steve Backshall is a TV nature adventure documentary starring the famous naturalist and explorer Steve Backshall. The series chronicles the attempts Steve makes to take on the risks needed to dominate certain challenges to exotic locations.

Production 
The show was adopted by PBS during a Fremantle deal. The UK channel Dave rebooted it essentially for an initial  4 episodes, but was extended to 6 ultimately. After a pre-air date deal, the French channel France Television bought the rights to air it in their country.

Expedition: Unpacked 

This spin-off series was commissioned in 2021 in an attempt to go behind the adventures of their original episodes.

Episodes

Season 1

Season 2

Reception 
In 2022, the programme was nominated for a Broadcast Award in the category Gamechanger Programme of the Year.

Katie Brooks of Birmingham Mail wrote, "Will inspire a new age of explorers."

References

External links 

2019 British television series debuts
2022 British television series endings
2010s British documentary television series
2020s British documentary television series
BBC television documentaries
Documentary films about nature
English-language television shows
Dave (TV channel) original programming